St John Passion or, in Latin, Passio Domini Nostri Iesu Christi secundum Ioannem (The Passion of Our Lord Jesus Christ according to John), refers to the Passion of Christ as told in chapters 18 and 19 of the Gospel of John.

It also may refer to compositions based on that text:
 Passio Secundum Johannem by Johann Walter, published in Neu Leipziger Gesangbuch, p. 227ff
 Passio Domini Nostri Jesu Christi secundum Johannem (1557) by Cipriano de Rore
Passio Secundum Johannem (1580) by Orlande de Lassus
 Historia der Passion und des Leidens unseres einigen Erlösers und Seligmachers Jesu Christi (1593) by Leonhard Lechner
 Passio Secundum Johannem by Teodoro Clinio (1595)
St. John Passion (1605) by William Byrd
 Johannes Passion  (1643) by Thomas Selle
Johannes-Passion (1666) by Heinrich Schütz
Passio Secundum Johannem by Alessandro Scarlatti
St John Passion (1724) by Johann Sebastian Bach
 Johannes Passion, 11 settings among Georg Philipp Telemann's Passions (1725–1765)
Johannes-Passion, attributed to Georg Friedrich Händel
Johannes-Passion by Georg Gebel 1748
 Johannes Passion, several settings among Carl Philipp Emanuel Bach's Passions (1772–1788) 
Passio (Passio Domini Nostri Jesu Christi secundum Joannem, 1982) by Arvo Pärt
Johannes-Passion (2000) by Sofia Gubaidulina
St John Passion (2008) by James MacMillan